Camp Meeting is the tenth studio album by American pianist and singer Bruce Hornsby, who was joined by Christian McBride (bass) and Jack DeJohnette (drums). Pat Metheny was credited as "de facto" executive producer.

The album received a favorable review from JazzTimes, which described Hornsby's collaborators as "the best in the business" and the set list as "spectacular". It said: "What fun this record is ... Nothing here sounds like his pop music. Not only is his playing remarkable, but so is the interaction among the three musicians. The music stretches and contracts. It races, it gallops and it rumbles ... If these guys stick with it, they’ll be the freshest piano trio out there."

Track listing
 "Questions and Answers" (Ornette Coleman) - 4:53
 "Charlie, Woody and You/Study #22" (B.R. Hornsby, Charles Ives) - 5:58
 "Solar" (Miles Davis) - 7:03
 "Death and the Flower" (Keith Jarrett) - 5:45
 "Camp Meeting" (B.R. Hornsby) - 5:43
 "Giant Steps" (John Coltrane) - 6:04
 "Celia" (Bud Powell) - 7:50
 "We'll Be Together Again" (Carl Fischer, Frankie Laine) - 5:38
 "Stacked Mary Possum" (B.R. Hornsby) - 4:34
 "Straight, No Chaser" (Thelonious Monk) - 2:59
 "Un Poco Loco/Chant Song" (Bud Powell, B.R. Hornsby) - 7:55

Personnel 
 Bruce Hornsby – grand piano
 Christian McBride – double bass
 Jack DeJohnette – drums

Production 
 Producer – Bruce Hornsby
 "De Facto" Executive Producer – Pat Metheny
 Engineer – Joe Ferla
 Additional Engineer – Wayne Pooley
 Mixing – Bruce Hornsby and Wayne Pooley
 Recorded at Tossington Sound (Williamsburg, VA).
 Mastered by Greg Calbi at Sterling Sound (New York, NY).
 Art Direction and Design – Dave Bett
 Photography and Cover Painting – Kathy Hornsby

References

2007 albums
Bruce Hornsby albums